Seoni Lok Sabha constituency was a Lok Sabha constituency in Madhya Pradesh. This seat was created in 1962 as a Scheduled Tribe seat. Following its inaugural appearance on the election rolls, Seoni ceased to exist for the next two general elections before it was made a permanent open seat in 1977.

Members of Parliament
1957: Narayanrao Maniram Wadiwa, Indian National Congress (as Chhindwara seat)
1962: Narayanrao Maniram Wadiwa, Indian National Congress 
1977: Nirmal Chandra Jain, Janata Party
1980: Gargi Shankar Mishra, Indian National Congress
1984: Gargi Shankar Mishra, Indian National Congress
1989: Prahlad Singh, Bharatiya Janata Party
1991: Vimla Varma, Indian National Congress 
1996: Prahlad Singh Patel, Bharatiya Janata Party
1998: Vimla Varma, Indian National Congress
1999: Ram Naresh Tripathi, Bharatiya Janata Party
2004: Neeta Pateriya, Bharatiya Janata Party

References
Election Commission of India -http://www.eci.gov.in/StatisticalReports/ElectionStatistics.asp

See also
 Seoni
 List of Constituencies of the Lok Sabha

Former Lok Sabha constituencies of Madhya Pradesh
2008 disestablishments in India
Constituencies disestablished in 2008
Former constituencies of the Lok Sabha